() is a member company of Italy's Ferrovie dello Stato group. It was created to rehabilitate and manage, even commercially, the 13 biggest Italian railway stations.

Stations under management
The Roma Termini railway station was the pilot of the Grandi Stazioni program.

The Italian railway stations currently operated by the group are:

Stations with darker background are not served by High-speed trains

In addition to these, the forthcoming Napoli Afragola and Firenze Belfiore stations, which will be part of Italian high-speed rail system, will also be included in this list.

Grandi Stazioni also operates beyond Italy's national borders: since December 2003, the company has adopted a position in the Czech Republic for the upgrading and management of three major railway stations: Praha hlavní nádraží, Karlovy Vary upper station (horní nádraží) and Marianske Lazne. In 2016 (after 13 years) Grandi Stazioni has failed to deliver the contractual obligation to reconstruct the Praha hlavní nádraží and has lost the lease. Grandi Stazioni has decided to sue the Czech Railway Infrastructure Administration for damages without providing the paperwork proving the actual costs spent.

Shareholders
Grandi Stazioni SpA is 60% controlled by Ferrovie dello Stato and 40% by Eurostazioni SpA.

Board of directors

The following people serve on the board of directors as of December 2013:

 President: Mauro Moretti
 Chief Executive Officer: Fabio Battaggia
 Board Member: Massimiliano Capece Minutolo Del Sasso
 Board Member: Gaetano Casertano
 Board Member: Fabio Corsico
 Board Member: Vittorio De Silvio
 Board Member: Maurizio Marchetti
 Board Member: Francesco Rossi
 Board Member: Carlo Vergara

See also

Centostazioni
Ferrovie dello Stato
High-speed rail
Rete Ferroviaria Italiana
Trenitalia

References

External links
 Grandi Stazioni official website 

Ferrovie dello Stato Italiane
Railway companies of Italy
Railway companies established in 1998
Companies based in Rome
Railway stations in Italy